Vermillion Township is one of five townships in Vermillion County, Indiana, United States. As of the 2010 census, its population was 924 and it contained 401 housing units.

History
Vermillion Township took its name from Vermillion County, which was named after the Vermilion River.

Geography

Cities
 Newport

Unincorporated towns
 Quaker at 
(This list is based on USGS data and may include former settlements.)

Cemeteries
The township contains twelve cemeteries: Carmack, Johnson, Johnson, Juliet, Lebanon, Memorial Chapel, Miller, Old Hopewell, Thomas, Walnut Hill, Wimsett and Zener.

Landmarks
 Newport Chemical Depot
 The Newport Covered Bridge was listed on the National Register of Historic Places in 1994.

School districts
 North Vermillion Community School Corporation

Political districts
 Indiana's 8th congressional district
 State House District 42
 State Senate District 38

References
 U.S. Board on Geographic Names (GNIS)
 United States Census Bureau 2007 TIGER/Line Shapefiles

External links
 Indiana Township Association
 United Township Association of Indiana

Townships in Vermillion County, Indiana
Townships in Indiana